John Schumacher may refer to:

 John Schumacher (Los Angeles pioneer), German immigrant, landowner and councilman in Los Angeles, California
 John J. Schumacher, founded Southwestern University School of Law in 1911
 John N. Schumacher, American-born Filipino priest, historian, and educator

See also
 John Schuhmacher (born 1995), American football player